Gevacolor is a color motion picture process. It was introduced in 1947 by Gevaert in Belgium, and an affiliate of Agfacolor. The process and company flourished in the 1950s as it was suitable for on location shooting. Both the companies merged in 1964 to form Agfa-Gevaert, and continued producing film stock till the 1980s.

List of films taken in Gevacolor

Bangladeshi films

Pakistani films

Turkish films

European films

Indian films

Malaysian films

See also
List of film formats
List of color film systems
Imbibition
List of early color feature films

References

History of film
Film and video technology
Photographic film makers